Kivi Peak is a peak,  high, marking the southern end of Cleveland Mesa on the east side of Michigan Plateau, Antarctica. It was mapped by the United States Geological Survey from surveys and U.S. Navy air photos, 1960–64, and was named by the Advisory Committee on Antarctic Names for Stephen Kivi, a utilitiesman at Byrd Station in 1962.

References

Mountains of Marie Byrd Land